Dream Lady, also known as the Eugene Field Memorial, is a bronze sculpture by Edward McCartan.
It is located in Lincoln Park, Chicago.

Eugene Field (1850–1895) was an author and journalist, and wrote a humor column, "Sharps and Flats", for the Chicago Daily News.  He was also well known as an author of poems for children.

History
The memorial cost $35,000, and was funded by public school children, citizens of Chicago and the B. F. Ferguson Monument Fund. It was dedicated on October 9, 1922.

The inscriptions reads: 

On upper base front left side:
Have you ever heard of the sugar plum tree
tis a marvel of great renown
it blooms on the shore of the lollipop sea
in the garden of shut eye town. 

On upper base front right side:
Wynken, Blinken and Nod one night
sailed off in a wooden shoe
sailed on a river of crystal light
into a sea of dew.

On back of base:
Erected in 1922 by
school children and
citizens aided by the
Benj. F. Ferguson Fund

See also
 List of public art in Chicago

References

External links
https://web.archive.org/web/20120402222911/http://www.cpdit01.com/resources/planning-and-development.fountains-monuments-and-sculptures/Lincoln%20Park%20Zoo/Eugene%20Field%20Memorial.pdf
"Eugene field Memorial", Chicago Outdoor Sculptures
https://web.archive.org/web/20120206154753/http://www.edwardmccartan.com/memorial.htm

Monuments and memorials in Chicago
Outdoor sculptures in Chicago
1922 sculptures
Bronze sculptures in Illinois
Statues in Chicago
1922 establishments in Illinois
Sculptures of women in Illinois
Sculptures of angels
Sculptures of children